The following outline is provided as an overview and topical guide to Singapore:

Singapore – a sovereign republic comprising the main island of Singapore and smaller outlying islands which are located at the southern tip of the Malay Peninsula in Southeast Asia.

Singapore is one of the three true city-states in the world, along with Monaco and the Vatican City, and is the only one with full self-governance, its own currency, and a significant military force. It is the second smallest nation in Asia by land area, ahead of Maldives and similar to Bahrain.

General reference

Pronunciation:  or 
Common English country name: Singapore
Official English country name:  The Republic of Singapore
Official endonyms: Singapore (English), Singapura (Malay),  (Pinyin: Xīnjiāpō, Mandarin),  (Ciŋkappūr, Tamil)
Common endonyms: Lion City, Little red dot, Temasek
Adjectival(s): Singaporean
Demonym(s): Singaporean
Etymology: Name of Singapore
International rankings of Singapore
ISO country codes: SG, SGP, 702
ISO region codes: See ISO 3166-2:SG
Internet country code top-level domain: .sg
Internationalised country code top-level domains: .新加坡 (encoded as .xn—yfro4i67o) and .சிங்கப்பூர் (encoded as .xn—clchc0ea0b2g2a9gcd)

Geography of Singapore

Singapore is: an island country made up of 63 islands
Location:
Northern Hemisphere and Eastern Hemisphere
Eurasia
Asia
Southeast Asia
Indochina
Maritime Southeast Asia
Time zone: Singapore Standard Time = ASEAN Common Time (UTC+08)
Extreme points of Singapore:
 High: Bukit Timah 
 Low: Singapore Strait 0 m
Land boundaries:  none (two causeways to Malaysia)
Coastline: 
Population of Singapore: 5,685,807 (2020)
Area of Singapore: 
Atlas of Singapore

Environment of Singapore

Astronomical phenomena
Next total solar eclipse visible in Singapore: 5 July 2168
Biosphere reserves in Singapore
Climate of Singapore
Environmental issues in Singapore
Geology of Singapore
Wildlife of Singapore
Flora of Singapore
Fauna of Singapore
Birds of Singapore
Mammals of Singapore

Natural geographic features of Singapore

Hills of Singapore
Islands of Singapore
Lakes of Singapore
Rivers of Singapore

Regions of Singapore

Administrative divisions of Singapore

Municipalities

Being a city-state, Singapore is both a city and a nation state
Singapore is its own only municipality
Capital of Singapore: Singapore is its own capital

Demography of Singapore

Government and politics of Singapore

Form of government: Unitary state under a Parliamentary democracy
Elections in Singapore
Political parties in Singapore
Taxation in Singapore

Branches of the government of Singapore

Executive branch of the government of Singapore

Head of state: President of Singapore, Halimah Yacob
Head of government: Prime Minister of Singapore, Lee Hsien Loong
Cabinet of Singapore

Legislative branch of the government of Singapore
Parliament of Singapore (unicameral)

Judicial branch of the government of Singapore

Judicial officers of the Republic of Singapore
Supreme Court of Singapore
Subordinate Courts of Singapore

Foreign relations of Singapore

Diplomatic missions in Singapore
Diplomatic missions of Singapore
Malaysia-Singapore relations
Singapore – United States relations

International organisation membership
The Republic of Singapore is a member of the:

Asian Development Bank (ADB)
Asia-Pacific Economic Cooperation (APEC)
Asia-Pacific Telecommunity (APT)
Association of Southeast Asian Nations (ASEAN)
Association of Southeast Asian Nations Regional Forum (ARF)
Bank for International Settlements (BIS)
Colombo Plan (CP)
Commonwealth of Nations
East Asia Summit (EAS)
Group of 77 (G77)
International Atomic Energy Agency (IAEA)
International Bank for Reconstruction and Development (IBRD)
International Chamber of Commerce (ICC)
International Civil Aviation Organization (ICAO)
International Criminal Police Organization (Interpol)
International Development Association (IDA)
International Federation of Red Cross and Red Crescent Societies (IFRCS)
International Finance Corporation (IFC)
International Hydrographic Organization (IHO)
International Labour Organization (ILO)
International Maritime Organization (IMO)
International Mobile Satellite Organization (IMSO)
International Monetary Fund (IMF)
International Olympic Committee (IOC)
International Organization for Standardization (ISO)
International Red Cross and Red Crescent Movement (ICRM)
International Telecommunication Union (ITU)
International Telecommunications Satellite Organization (ITSO)
International Trade Union Confederation (ITUC)
Inter-Parliamentary Union (IPU)
Multilateral Investment Guarantee Agency (MIGA)
Nonaligned Movement (NAM)
Organisation for the Prohibition of Chemical Weapons (OPCW)
Pacific Economic Cooperation Council (PECC)
Permanent Court of Arbitration (PCA)
Regional Comprehensive Economic Partnership (RCEP)
United Nations (UN)
United Nations Conference on Trade and Development (UNCTAD)
United Nations Educational, Scientific, and Cultural Organization (UNESCO)
United Nations Integrated Mission in Timor-Leste (UNMIT)
Universal Postal Union (UPU)
World Confederation of Labour (WCL)
World Customs Organization (WCO)
World Federation of Trade Unions (WFTU)
World Health Organization (WHO)
World Intellectual Property Organization (WIPO)
World Meteorological Organization (WMO)
World Trade Organization (WTO)

Law and order in Singapore

Criminal law of Singapore
Capital punishment in Singapore
Crime in Singapore
Constitution of Singapore
Human rights in Singapore
LGBT rights in Singapore
Freedom of religion in Singapore
Law enforcement in Singapore
Sources of Singapore law

Military of Singapore

Singapore Armed Forces
 Army of Singapore: Singapore Army
 Navy of Singapore: Republic of Singapore Navy
 Air force of Singapore: Republic of Singapore Air Force
 Military history of Singapore
 Military ranks of Singapore

History of Singapore

Early history of Singapore (before 1819)
Founding years of modern Singapore (1819-1826)
Singapore in the Straits Settlements (1826–1942)
Japanese occupation of Singapore (1942-1945)
Post-war Singapore (1945-1959)
Self-governance of Singapore (1959-1963)
Singapore in Malaysia (1963-1965)
History of independent Singapore (1965-current)
Military history of Singapore

Culture of Singapore

Built heritage of Singapore
Architecture of Singapore
National monuments of Singapore
Protected areas of Singapore
World Heritage Sites:
Singapore Botanic Gardens, since 2015
Cuisine of Singapore
Eurasians in Singapore
Indians in Singapore
Malays in Singapore
Festivals in Singapore
Holidays in Singapore

Languages of Singapore
English
Malay
Mandarin
Tamil
Media in Singapore
Internet
Newspapers
Radio
Television 

National symbols of Singapore
Coat of arms of Singapore
Lion head symbol
Merlion
National anthem of Singapore
National flag of Singapore
National flower of Singapore (Vanda Miss Joaquim)
National pledge of Singapore
People of Singapore
Prostitution in Singapore

Religion in Singapore

 Freedom of religion in Singapore
 Buddhism in Singapore
 Christianity in Singapore
 Hinduism in Singapore
 Islam in Singapore
 Sikhism in Singapore
 Taoism in Singapore
 Irreligion in Singapore

The arts in Singapore

Visual art of Singapore
Cinema of Singapore
Literature of Singapore
Music of Singapore
Television in Singapore
Theatres in Singapore

Sports in Singapore

Football in Singapore
Rugby union in Singapore
Singapore Grand Prix
Singapore at the Olympics
2010 Summer Youth Olympics
National Physical Fitness Award
Foreign Sports Talent Scheme

Economy and infrastructure of Singapore

Economic rank, by nominal GDP (2007): 45th (forty-fifth)
Agriculture in Singapore
Banking in Singapore
Monetary Authority of Singapore
Communications in Singapore
Internet in Singapore
Companies of Singapore
Currency of Singapore: Dollar
ISO 4217: SGD
Energy in Singapore
Oil industry in Singapore
Healthcare in Singapore
Singapore Exchange
Tourism in Singapore
 Visa policy of Singapore
Water supply and sanitation in Singapore

Transport in Singapore

 Certificate of Entitlement
 EZ-Link
 Johor-Singapore Causeway
 Ministry of Transport (Singapore)
 Singapore Area Licensing Scheme
 Singapore Cable Car

Road transport in Singapore

Driving in Singapore
Public buses of Singapore
Taxicabs of Singapore
Public Transport Council
Singapore licence plates
Expressways of Singapore

Aviation in Singapore

Civil Aviation Authority of Singapore
List of airports in Singapore
 Changi Airport
Singapore Airshow

Rail transport in Singapore

Rail transport in Singapore
Eastern and Oriental Express
Keretapi Tanah Melayu

Monorails in Singapore
Jurong BirdPark Panorail
Sentosa Express

Light Rail Transit

List of Singapore LRT stations
Fares and ticketing on the Light Rail Transit
Bukit Panjang LRT line
Punggol LRT line
Sengkang LRT line

Mass Rapid Transit

Network
Circle MRT Line
Downtown MRT Line
East West MRT Line
North East MRT Line
North South MRT Line
Fares and ticketing on the Mass Rapid Transit
History of the Mass Rapid Transit
Safety on the Mass Rapid Transit
Security on the Mass Rapid Transit

Transport operators of Singapore

ComfortDelGro
PSA International
SBS Transit
SMRT Corporation
Tower Transit Singapore
Go-Ahead Singapore

Transport disasters in Singapore
Nicoll Highway collapse
Singapore cable car disaster
Spyros disaster
SilkAir Flight 185
Singapore Airlines Flight 006

Education in Singapore

List of schools in Singapore
List of universities in Singapore
Gifted Education Programme
Integrated Programme
National examinations in Singapore
Primary School Leaving Examination
GCE O-Level
GCE A-Level
Co-curricular activity

See also

Index of Singapore-related articles
International rankings of Singapore
Member state of the Commonwealth of Nations
Member state of the United Nations
Outline of Asia
Outline of geography

Notes

External links

General Information
Official online communication platform and repository of the Singapore Government
Singapore Government Directory
Department of Statistics Singapore - Key indicators of Singapore
CIA World Factbook Entry for Singapore
Singapore Accounting and Corporate Regulatory Authority

Travel

Maps
WikiSatellite view of Singapore at WikiMapia

Singapore
Singapore
Singapore
 1